The Stranger is a 2000 Austrian film directed by Götz Spielmann. It was Austria's submission to the 73rd Academy Awards for the Academy Award for Best Foreign Language Film, but was not accepted as a nominee.

See also
Cinema of Austria
List of submissions to the 73rd Academy Awards for Best Foreign Language Film

References

External links

2000 films
Austrian crime drama films
2000s German-language films